The following Union Army units and commanders fought in the Battle of Franklin (1864) of the American Civil War. Order of battle compiled from the army organization during the campaign. The Confederate order of battle is shown separately.

Abbreviations used

Military rank

 MG = Major General
 BG = Brigadier General
 Col = Colonel
 Ltc = Lieutenant Colonel
 Cpt = Captain
 Bvt = Brevet

Other

 k = killed
 mw = mortally wounded
 w = wounded

Army of the Ohio

MG John M. Schofield

IV Corps

MG David S. Stanley (w)

XXIII Corps

BG Jacob D. Cox

Cavalry Corps
MG James H. Wilson

Escort:
 4th U.S. Cavalry: Lt Joseph Hedges

See also
U.S. War Department, The War of the Rebellion: a Compilation of the Official Records of the Union and Confederate Armies, U.S. Government Printing Office, 1880–1901.

Notes

References

 Battle of Franklin: Union order of battle (Civil War Trust)

American Civil War orders of battle